The Cornish Rex is a breed of domestic cat. The Cornish Rex has no hair except for down. Most breeds of cat have three different types of hair in their coats: the outer fur or "guard hairs", a middle layer called the "awn hair"; and the down hair or undercoat, which is very fine and about 1 cm long. Cornish Rexes only have the undercoat. They are prone to hair loss and many will develop a very thin coat or even go bald over large parts of their body. The curl in their fur is caused by a different mutation and gene than that of the Devon Rex. The breed originated in Cornwall, Great Britain.

Characteristics
The coat of a Cornish Rex is extremely fine and sometimes curly. Their light coat means that they are best suited for indoor living in warm and dry conditions, as they are sensitive to low temperatures. They like to stay near warm places such as computer monitors, light bulbs, laps and shoulders.

The breed is sometimes referred to as the Greyhound of the cats, because of the sleek appearance and the galloping run characteristic of the breed. These cats tend to stay playful and kittenish throughout their long lives. Some Cornish Rexes like to play fetch, race other pets, or do acrobatic jumps. The Cornish Rex is an adventurous cat and is very intelligent. It can readily adapt to new situations and will explore wherever it can go. The Rex is extremely curious, seeks out the company of people and is friendly towards other companion animals.

Cornish Rex cats come in a wide variety of coat colours and patterns, outlined in the breed standard: solids, including white, black, chocolate, orange and the dilutes blue, lilac and cream; all forms of tabby including classic, mackerel and ticked tabbies, bicolor "tuxedo" coat in many colours, tortoiseshell, "smoke" colours and the colour-point pattern standard in the Siamese breed.

Genetics
In 2013, researchers identified the mutation that defines the Cornish Rex breed. Genome-wide analyses were performed in the Cornish Rex breed and in 11 phenotypically diverse breeds and two random bred populations. A gene on chromosome A1, the lysophosphatidic acid receptor 6 (LPAR6), was identified to have a 4 base pair deletion. This induces a premature stop codon in the receptor that is absent in all straight haired cats analyzed. LPAR6 encodes a receptor essential for maintaining the structural integrity of the hair shaft. In humans, LPAR6 mutations result in a form of ectodermal dysplasia characterised by a woolly hair phenotype.

Origin 
The Cornish Rex is a genetic mutation that originated from a litter of kittens born in the 1950s on a farm in Cornwall, UK. One of the kittens, a cream-colored male named Kallibunker, had an extremely unusual, fine and curly coat; he was the first Cornish Rex. The owner then backcrossed Kallibunker to his mother to produce 2 other curly-coated kittens. The male, Poldhu, sired a female called Lamorna Cove who was later brought to America and crossed with a Siamese, giving the breed their long whippy tails and big ears.

The Devon Rex looks similar in appearance to the Cornish Rex but has guard hairs and sheds. The Devon Rex mutation is different from the Cornish Rex mutation in that the Devon has shortened guard hairs, while the Cornish Rex lacks guard hairs altogether. Crosses between Devon and Cornish Rexes are not permitted in pedigrees and matings between them will not produce a cat with short wavy fur. Another hair-deficient breed is the Sphynx cat, which has no hair but may have a very light coat of fuzz.

Hypoallergenic 

Despite some belief to the contrary, the Cornish Rex's short hair does not make it non- or hypo-allergenic. Allergic reactions from cats are not the result of hair length, but from a glyco-protein known as Fel d 1, produced in the sebaceous glands of the skin, saliva, and urine. Most people who have cat allergies are reacting to this protein in cat saliva and cat dander: when the cat cleans its fur, the saliva dries and is transformed into dust that people breathe in. Since Cornish Rex cats groom as much as or even more than ordinary cats, a Cornish Rex cat can still produce a reaction in people who are allergic to cats. It is, however, widely reported to cause lesser to little allergic reaction. It is recommended a potential owner visit a cattery to check their own tolerance.

References

External links

Cornish Rex Club of Canada - Cornish Rex cat breed association that promotes and protects the breed in Canada.

Cat breeds
Rex cat breeds
Cat breeds originating in England
Cornwall